Brasília is the capital of Brazil.

Brasilia may also refer to:
293 Brasilia, Main belt asteroid
Embraer EMB 120 Brasilia, twin-turboprop commuter airliner, produced by Embraer of Brazil
Volkswagen Brasília, compact car made in Brazil
Brasília (footballer) (born 1977), full name Cristiano Pereira de Souza, Brazilian footballer
Wésley Brasilia (born 1981), Brazilian footballer
Autódromo Internacional Nelson Piquet (Brasília), racing circuit formerly called Autódromo de Brasília, and still commonly referred to by its previous name